Sergei Elvirovich Kishchenko (born 27 June 1972) is a former Russian professional football player.

External links
 

1972 births
Footballers from Moscow
Living people
Soviet footballers
Russian footballers
Association football defenders
FC Znamya Truda Orekhovo-Zuyevo players
FC Iskra Smolensk players
NK Veres Rivne players
FC Metalurh Kostiantynivka players
FC Spartak-UGP Anapa players
Ukrainian First League players
Russian expatriate footballers
Expatriate footballers in Ukraine
Russian football managers